Niníne Éces (fl. 700) was an Irish poet, thought to be a member of the Uí Echdach, a kindred known for learning, who were located in the south and west of what is now County Armagh. They are recorded as producing several high-ranking ecclesiastics.

Niníne's surviving compositions include Admuinemmar nóeb-Patraicc. This poem, addressed to St. Patrick, was the basis for Dóchas Linn Naomh Pádraig by Tomás Ó Flannghaile (1846–1915).

Sources
Oxford Concise Companion to Irish Literature, Robert Welsh, 1996. 

8th-century Irish people
People from County Armagh
8th-century Irish poets
Irish male poets
8th-century Irish writers
Irish-language writers